Brambilla is an Italian surname derived from Val Brembana in Italy. In the 1700s the name travelled to a small town in the state of Jalisco Mexico and was modified to Brambila to retain pronunciation in Spanish.

Geographical distribution
As of 2014, 84.6% of all known bearers of the surname Brambilla were residents of Italy (frequency 1:1,475), 8.5% of Brazil (1:49,339) and 3.6% of Argentina (1:24,509).

In Italy, the frequency of the surname was higher than national average (1:1,475) in only one region: Lombardy (1:246).

People
 Edy Brambila (born 1986), Mexican footballer
 Elena Brambilla (1942–2018), Italian historian
 Ernesto Brambilla, Italian motorcycle and racecar driver
 Fernando Brambila (1763-1834), Italian-Spanish painter and engraver
 Francesco Brambilla, Italian sculptor of the Renaissance period
 Franco Brambilla (archbishop) (1923–2003), Vatican diplomat 
 Gianluca Brambilla, Italian racing cyclist
 Giovanni Alessandro Brambilla, Italian physician
 Giovanni Battista Brambilla, Italian painter
 Giuseppina Brambilla, Italian opera singer, sister of Marietta and Teresa
 Gustavo Brambila (born 1953), Mexican-American winemaker
 Leticia Brambila Paz, Mexican mathematician
 Marco Brambilla, Italian-born Canadian artist and filmmaker.
 Maria Brambilla, Italian ballerina, stage name Sofia Fuoco
 Marietta Brambilla,  Italian opera singer, sister of Giuseppina and Teresa 
 Massimo Brambilla, Italian football player
 Michela Vittoria Brambilla, Italian politician and businesswoman
 Nora Brambilla, Italian and German physicist
 Pierre Brambilla, French road bicycle racer
 Teresa Brambilla, Italian opera singer, sister of Giuseppina and Marietta 
 Teresina Brambilla, Italian opera singer, niece of Giuseppina, Marietta, and Teresa 
 Vittorio Brambilla, Italian Formula One driver

See also
 640 Brambilla, a minor planet orbiting the Sun
 Brembilla (disambiguation)

References

Italian-language surnames
Surnames of Italian origin